The weightlifting competition at the 2014 Pan American Sports Festival was held in Mexico City. The tournament was held from 19–21 July at the Centro Nacional de Desarrollo de Talentos Deportivos y Alto Rendimiento.

Medal summary

Men's events

Women's events

Medal table

References

External links
Official Website

2014 Pan American Sports Festival
2014 in weightlifting
Pan American Sports Festival